The Union Street station is a local station on the BMT Fourth Avenue Line of the New York City Subway. It is located at the corner of Fourth Avenue and Union Street in Brooklyn, New York City, serving the communities of Park Slope, Gowanus and Carroll Gardens. It is served by the R train at all times. The D and N trains also stop here during late nights, and some rush-hour W trains stop here in the peak direction.

The Union Street station was constructed as part of the Fourth Avenue Line, which was approved in 1905. Construction on the segment of the line that includes Union Street started on December 20, 1909, and was completed in September 1912. The station opened on June 22, 1915, as part of the initial portion of the BMT Fourth Avenue Line to 59th Street. The station's platforms were lengthened in 1926–1927, and again during a renovation in 1968–1970. The station was also renovated in 1970 and in the mid-1990s.

History

Construction and opening

The Union Street station was constructed as part of the Fourth Avenue Line, the plan for which was initially adopted on June 1, 1905. The Rapid Transit Commission was succeeded on July 1, 1907, by the New York State Public Service Commission (PSC), which approved the plan for the line in late 1907. The contract for the section of the line that included the Union Street station, Route 11A2, which extended from 10th Street to Sackett Street, was awarded on May 22, 1908, to the E.E. Smith Construction Company for $2,296,234.93. The New York City Board of Estimate approved the contract on October 29, 1909. Construction on the segment started on December 20, 1909, and was completed in September 1912.

As part of negotiations between New York City, the Brooklyn Rapid Transit Company (BRT), and the Interborough Rapid Transit Company for the expansion of the city's transit network, the line was leased to a subsidiary of the BRT. The agreement, known as Contract 4 of the Dual Contracts, was signed on March 19, 1913. Union Street opened on June 22, 1915, as part of an extension of the subway to Coney Island, which included the Fourth Avenue Line north of 59th Street as well as the entire Sea Beach Line. The station's opening was marked with a competition between two trains heading from Chambers Street station in Manhattan to the Coney Island station, one heading via the West End Line and the other via the Sea Beach Line; the latter got to Coney Island first.

Station renovations

1920s 
On June 27, 1922, the New York State Transit Commission directed its engineers to prepare plans to lengthen the platforms at 23 stations on the lines of the Brooklyn–Manhattan Transit Corporation (BMT), the successor to the BRT, to accommodate eight-car trains. Though the Transit Commission ordered the BMT to lengthen these platforms in September 1923, progress on the extensions did not occur until February 16, 1925, when the New York City Board of Transportation (NYCBOT) directed its engineers to prepare plans to lengthen the platforms at this and eleven other stations along the Fourth Avenue Line. It estimated the project's cost to be $633,000. The NYCBOT received bids for the project on February 25, 1926. The contract was awarded to the Corson Construction Company for $345,021. The extensions opened on August 1, 1927.

1950s and 1960s 
The city government took over the BMT's operations on June 1, 1940. In July 1959, the New York City Transit Authority (NYCTA) announced that it would install fluorescent lighting at the Union Street station and five other stations along the Fourth Avenue Line for between $175,000 and $200,000. Bids on the project were to be advertised on August 7, 1959 and completed by fall 1960.

On July 14, 1967, the NYCTA awarded a contract to conduct test borings at eleven stations on the Fourth Avenue Line, including Union Street, to the W. M. Walsh Corporation for $6,585 in preparation of the construction of platform extensions. The NYCTA issued an invitation for bids on the project to extend the platforms at stations along the Fourth Avenue Line between Pacific Street and 36th Street, including those at Union Street, on March 28, 1969. The contract was awarded to the Horn Construction Company on May 13, 1969, for $7,381,890. Funding for the renovation projects came out of the NYCTA's 1969–1970 Capital Budget, costing $8,177,890 in total.

As part of the renovation project, the station's platforms were extended  to the north, and the station's elaborate mosaic tile walls were covered over with  white cinderblock tiles. The latter change, which was also made to 15 other stations on the BMT Broadway and Fourth Avenue Line, was criticized for being dehumanizing. The NYCTA spokesman stated that the old tiles were in poor condition and that the change was made to improve the appearance of stations and provide uniformity. Furthermore, it did not consider the old mosaics to have "any great artistic merit".

1990s 

The station was renovated again from 1991 to 1994. The $2.397 million contract for the project was awarded on February 28, 1991. During the closure of the Bay Ridge-bound platform, the glazed tiles at the station were heavily defaced with graffiti, and were cleaned prior to the station's reopening with a heavy duty cleaner, which damaged the glazing. A modification to the contract was approved on May 23, 1994. As part of the modification, new graffiti resistant ceramic tile was installed, signage, advertising panels, benches and trash bins were removed and reinstalled, exhaust systems were added in the porter rooms at both platforms, and the wall-mounted conductors board was replaced by a ceiling-mounted one. The modification cost $174,000, and change orders cost $111,004. The Brooklyn-bound platform was closed between July 15 and November 15, 1991, while the Manhattan-bound platform was closed between February 19 and June 20, 1992.

In addition to upgrading the same elements that were replaced in the previous overhaul, floors and track wall tiling, the public announcement system, and safety treads along platform edges and track-beds were replaced. It also included an art installation by Emmett Wigglesworth called CommUnion. It features twenty-two panels of various designs in the recessed area of the platform tiles above the station signs and other designs on the openings in the track walls.

Proposed accessibility 
As part of the 2015–2019 Metropolitan Transportation Authority Capital Program, $300 million was allocated to enhance station access and provide ADA-accessibility at 15 stations chosen by New York City. Four stations were being evaluated for such improvements, including the Union Street station.

In 2019, development firm Avery Hall Investments offered to pay $11 million for a new entrance to the southbound platform, including an elevator, as part of the development of a 17-story building on the northwestern corner of Fourth Avenue and Union Street. In exchange, the developers would be able to add  of space to their building. In late March 2022, 204 4th Avenue LLC submitted an application for the new easement entrance to the New York City government.

Station layout

This underground station has four tracks and two side platforms. The R stops here at all times; some rush-hour W trains stop here in the peak direction; and the D and N stop here during late nights, but use the center express tracks to bypass the station during daytime hours. A white tiled curtain wall separates the express tracks from the local tracks.

Both platforms are columnless except for a section at their extreme north ends, where they were extended in 1970 to accommodate 10-car trains. Here, the columns are cream colored I-beams. The ceiling is lower in this section.

Prior to the station's 1970 renovation, it was finished all in white and marble tile with green trim, in a distinctive shade to allow regular passengers to identify the station based only on the color of the marble trimmings. Since the renovation, the station walls have consisted of white cinderblock tiles, except for small recesses in the walls, which contain gray-painted cinderblock tiles. The gray cinderblock field contains the station-name signs and white text pointing to the exits.

Exits
Each platform has one same-level fare control area in the center and there are no crossovers or crossunders to allow free transfer between directions. The Manhattan-bound side has a fare control area, a turnstile bank, token booth, and two street stairs. The stairs on the Manhattan-bound platform go up to the southeast corner of Union Street and Fourth Avenue while those on the Bay Ridge-bound platform goes up to the southwest corner. The Bay Ridge-bound side has a fare control area, a turnstile bank without a token booth, and two street stairs.

References

External links 

 
 The Subway Nut — Union Street Pictures
 MTA's Arts For Transit — Union Street (BMT Fourth Avenue Line)
 Union Street entrance from Google Maps Street View
 Platform from Google Maps Street View

BMT Fourth Avenue Line stations
New York City Subway stations in Brooklyn
Railway stations in the United States opened in 1915
1915 establishments in New York City
Park Slope